Harvard University's Smith Campus Center (formerly Holyoke Center) is a Brutalist administrative and service building occupying the block bounded by Massachusetts Avenue, Dunster Street, Holyoke Street, and Mount Auburn Street in Cambridge, Massachusetts, directly opposite the Wadsworth Gate to Harvard Yard. It houses administrative offices, an infirmary of the University Health Services, and a retail/restaurant arcade.

Design
Primarily designed by José Luis Sert (then dean of the Harvard Graduate School of Design) and completed in 1966, the Smith Campus Center is an H-shaped ten-story reinforced concrete building. The building was constructed in two phases over a six-year period between 1960 and 1966. The first phase—the southern half of the building facing Mount Auburn Street—began in 1960 and was occupied in 1962. Construction of the second phase began in 1964 and was completed in 1966. The landscaped area at the corner of Massachusetts Avenue and Dunster Street—known as Forbes Plaza—was completed the following year in 1967. As a permanent tribute, the plaza and arcade inside the Holyoke Center were named in honor of Edward W. Forbes. The occasion was marked by a ceremony on 17 October 1966 

After the first phase of construction in 1963, the Harvard Crimson cited a local joke: "The one nice feature about Holyoke Center is that it's the one place in Cambridge from which you can't see Holyoke Center". Within a few years the building's novel design and technical features began to present numerous difficulties, which a Harvard official likened to "a five-car accident at an intersection. You just can't tell what caused it." These included crumbling of exterior structural concrete and an inefficient three-pipe heating and cooling system.

It was Harvard's first highrise building, and has been called a "gray elephant" for the color of its concrete facades.

Artworks
From 1964 to 1979, the penthouse dining room was decorated with five large paintings installed by Mark Rothko, an Abstract Expressionist artist. Due to high levels of direct sunlight onto the paintings and the presence of lithol red's calcium salt, the paintings faded severely and were moved to protective storage in 1979. Since their removal, the artworks have been publicly displayed only five times, most recently from November 2014 to July 2015, at the newly renovated Harvard Art Museums.

Danh Vō's We the People was installed in honor of Drew Gilpin Faust as part of the renovation of the building in 2018.

Renaming and renovation
Originally known as Holyoke Center, in 2013 it was renamed the Richard A. and Susan F. Smith Campus Center. Over the next several years, its underwent extensive renovation to create gathering, lounge, and study spaces, and space for exhibitions, events, and performances, after reopening in 2018.

References

Harvard University buildings
Harvard Square
Brutalist architecture in Massachusetts
Buildings and structures completed in 1966
Skyscrapers in Massachusetts
Skyscraper office buildings in Massachusetts